Takahiro Ikeyama (池山 隆寛, born December 17, 1965 in Amagasaki, Hyōgo, Japan) is a former Nippon Professional Baseball infielder. A slugging shortstop, Ikeyama played for the Yakult Swallows his entire career, from 1984–2002.

Ikeyama was a five-time Central League Best Nine Award-winner and a seven-time NPB All-Star. He won the 1992 Central League Golden Glove Award.

Ikeyama was part of the Central League-champion Swallows team that lost the 1992 Japan Series to Seibu. He was a member of the 1993, 1995, 1997, and 2001 Swallows squads that won the Japan Series those years.

Some years after retiring as a player, Ikeyama joined the coaching staff of the Tohoku Rakuten Golden Eagles; he has been a coach with the Swallows since 2011.

Jim Albright, an expert on Japanese professional baseball, ranks Ikeyama as among the top shortstops in NPB history, on the Swallows' franchise all-star team, on the 1990s Central League all-star team, and on the overall 1990s all-star team.

See also 
 List of top Nippon Professional Baseball home run hitters

References

External links

1965 births
Living people
Baseball people from Hyōgo Prefecture
Japanese baseball players
Nippon Professional Baseball infielders
Yakult Swallows players
Japanese baseball coaches
Nippon Professional Baseball coaches
Sportspeople from Amagasaki